Meinertulidae is a family of mites in the order Mesostigmata.

Species
Meinertulidae contains one genus, with one recognized species:

 Genus Meinertula Trägårdh, 1950
 Meinertula hamifera Trägårdh, 1950

References

Mesostigmata
Acari families